Jesús Mateo Calderón Barrueto (21 September 1920 in Cajabamba – 28 October 2010 in Puno) was a Peruvian prelate of the Roman Catholic Church.

Calderón was ordained a priest on December 27, 1947 from the Roman Catholic religious order of the Order of Friars Preachers. Calderón was appointed auxiliary bishop of the Diocese of Ica, as well as titular bishop of Mevania, on March 13, 1969 and was ordained bishop on April 27, 1969. Calderón was appointed bishop of the Diocese of Puno on November 3, 1972, where he served until his retirement on February 14, 1998.

Notes

1920 births
2010 deaths
20th-century Roman Catholic bishops in Peru
Roman Catholic bishops of Puno
Roman Catholic bishops of Ica